Jordannah Elizabeth (born October 16, 1986 in Baltimore, MD) is an American journalist, lecturer, music critic, author and screenwriter.

Journalism and lectures (2013–2020) 
Elizabeth started her professional writing career by earning bylines in Vice Magazine, Nerve.com and Bitch Media in March 2013. In October 2013, she was brought on as a regular contributing writer and entertainment reporter for New York Amsterdam News arts and entertainment section where she has conducted high-profile interviews with African American leaders of their fields like producer, Teddy Riley, Walter Williams of The O'Jays and Black Girls Code founder, Kimberly Bryant.

As a national journalist, Jordannah wrote for a number of Bay Area publications in 2014 such as San Francisco Bay Guardian, East Bay Express SF Weekly where she most notably interviewed Talib Kweli and Ishmael Butler of Shabazz Palaces She worked as the associate editor of The Deli Magazine San Francisco from 2013 to 2017. Jordannah expanded her reach as a global music journalist, writing for the now defunct International music sector of MTV called MTV Iggy,.

On July 26, 2016, Jordannah made her debut at LA Weekly with an interview with poet, musician and author Saul Williams. Jordannah's work on rock music and criticism. Her rock writing included interviews with Hope Sandoval of Mazzy Star, Chris Stein of Blondie, Devendra Banhart, Miranda Lee Richards, The Warlocks, Imaad Wasif and Dead Meadow. Elizabeth also tackled issues of diversity and rape culture in the music industry. She wrote notable articles exploring Black women in rock and rock criticism with the articles "The Only Black Woman in the Room": Black Female Rock Journalists Share Their Experiences", which featured the voices of Black women rock critics Kandia Crazy Horse, Trina Dharma Green and Nia Hampton and "Black Female Guitarists Get Real About How the Music Industry Views Them" which broke ground in the conversation of the inclusion of Black women in rock.

Her LA Weekly catalog also includes a 2016 interview with Jackie Fox  (also known as Jackie Fuchs) of The Runaways on rape culture in rock which followed a 2015 interview in Bitch Media where Jackie shares the accounts of her rape by manager Kim Fowley in 1974. She also wrote an intelligent essay on the topic called Dear Men of the Music Industry: You Can Do Better which was published one month after the MeToo Movement broke.

From September 2017 to May 2018, Elizabeth covered MeToo and contributed regularly for Ms. Magazine, her most notable articles being The Intersectionality of Believability, Will 2017 Be the Year of Hollywood’s Feminist Reckoning? Elizabeth continued her work as an essayist during the MeToo era by writing the essay For Black Women Survivors, #MeToo Is Still Falling Short for PopSugar in October 2018.

In 2018 have expanded to Chicago Reader, DownBeat, Hearst Magazines, NPR Music, Condé Nast and other publications. Elizabeth's writing ranges from interviews, music journalism, personal essays, articles on healing in relationships and trauma to literary journalism. Her broad voice has made her an active teacher and lecturer, teaching writing and journalism workshops at institutions like Maryland Institute College of Art and Center for New Music in San Francisco. She has lectured at Pratt Institute in Brooklyn, New York, De Montfort University in Leicester, England, and was invited as a guest journalist at Harvard University's Black Lives Matter: Music, Race, and Justice Conference in February 2017. She has also moderated panels on literature and film at Baltimore Book Festival and Creative Alliance in Baltimore, MD.

Jordannah became the editor in chief of TERSE. journal in 2018 through 2020 after contributing to the online literary journal as a columnist since 2016.

In 2020, her writing appeared in Chamber Music Magazine, New York City Jazz Record, The ZORA Music Canon , Universal Music Group's branded content online publication, uDiscover Music and has written a COVID-19 arts & entertainment column for New York Amsterdam News entitled Stealth Isolation. In August 2020, she was a participant in the inaugural Florence Price Festival as a panelist on the Race and Gender in Classical Music Criticism in panel.

In December 2020, Jordannah was brought on as editor in chief of Mutual Mentorship for Musicians, which was founded by musicians Jen Shyu and Sara Serpa. She designed and spearheaded the organization's first anthology on her literary journal, Publik / Private.

Journalism and lectures (2021) 
Jordannah interviewed Emmy Award-winning filmmaker, Stanley Nelson Jr. for New York Amsterdam News in March 2021. On March 21, 2021, Jordannah penned a theoretical series entitled Feminist Jazz Journalism, Now! which was published by Jazz Journalist Association. The articles explore the intersection of jazz and feminist theory. Feminist Jazz Journalism, Now! Is followed by Part 2: A solution-based analysis where she offers solutions to combat the misogynistic dominance of white male jazz critics and further makes a point in Part 3: Speculative Futures & New Jazz Journalism that without the proper, fair and equal acknowledgement of women and diverse jazz musicians and writers, the future of jazz may not prevail. Jordannah also founded the jazz criticism archive called Feminist Jazz Review where much of her women and LGBTQ centered jazz journalism is compiled and published with links to their respective original publications.

In April 2021, she was selected as a keynote speaker and panelist at the Columbia University's Music Scholarship Conference along with classical music critic, Anne Midgette and Emmy award winning video journalist, Estelle Caswell.

On June 10, 2021 Jordannah was personally invited by jazz drummer Terri Lyne Carrington and founder of the Berklee Institute Jazz and Gender Justice to share the closing remarks for Return to Center: Black Women, Jazz and Jazz Education symposium which was hosted by the institute.

Her children's book, She Raised Her Voice!: 50 Black Women Who Sang Their Way into Music History  published by Running Press Kids is due out in December 2021.

Television and radio 
Jordannah's has shared commentary and made many guest appearances on radio shows and podcasts including CBC syndicated radio, BBC 2, WYPR and several podcast shows. She has appeared episodes of the Reelz Channel music docu-series, Breaking the Band and is slated to appear on the Reelz Channel/Viacom CBS International Studios music docu-series, The Story of the Song. She has also work on projects by Bert Marcus Productions and the UK production company, RAW TV.

Jordannah is a recipient of the Sundance Institutes' Press Inclusive Initiative grant and received scholarships to study television writing at Sundance Co//ab.

As a screenwriter, Jordannah has written an original pilot based on her novella series, The Warmest Low and wrote the script for an episode of the PBS Digital web series, Sound Field. She has been mentored by screenwriters and showrunners, Jessica Hinds, Diane Ruggiero, Krista Vernoff and Evette Vargas.

Books 

 Don't Lose Track Vol. 1: 40 Selected Articles, Essays and Q&As. (Zer0 Books) 2016
 The Warmest Low (Chapbook One) Limited Edition Two. (Publik / Private Small Press) 2017
 She Raised Her Voice!: 50 Black Women Who Sang Their Way into Music History. (Running Press Kids) 2021

References

External links
Official Publik Private website
Official the Process Records website

Living people
American music journalists
1986 births
Writers from Baltimore
American music critics
African-American writers
American feminist writers
American columnists
American women columnists
Feminist musicians
American women music critics
Journalists from Maryland
21st-century American journalists
21st-century American women writers
21st-century American musicians
21st-century American women musicians
African-American journalists
African-American women musicians
21st-century African-American women
21st-century African-American musicians
20th-century African-American people
20th-century African-American women